Morgannwg: Transactions of the Glamorgan Local History Society is the annual English-language scholarly journal of the Glamorgan History Society, published since 1957, containing historical essays, archaeological reports and book reviews. It also contains society notes and meeting reports. The title comes from the Welsh word for Glamorgan (one of the thirteen historic counties of Wales).

Glamorgan Local History Society (Cymdeithas Hanes Morgannwg) was founded in 1950 to promote the study of the history of the county of Glamorgan; in 1966 it changed its name to Glamorgan History Society.

The journal has been digitized by the Welsh Journals Online project at the National Library of Wales.

References

External links
Glamorgan History Society publications
Morgannwg at Welsh Journals Online

Annual magazines published in the United Kingdom
English-language magazines
History magazines published in the United Kingdom
Magazines established in 1957
Magazines published in Wales
Local interest magazines published in the United Kingdom